Amirabad-e Now (also Romanized as Amīrābād-e Now and Amīrābād Now; also known as Amīnābād-e Now, Amīrābād, and Amīrābād-e Kohneh) is a village in Sagezabad Rural District, in the Central District of Buin Zahra County, Qazvin Province, Iran. At the 2006 census, its population was 1,285, in 348 families.

References 

Populated places in Buin Zahra County